Agustín Alejandro Curruhinca (born 6 January 2000) is an Argentine professional footballer who plays as a left winger for Nueva Chicago, on loan from Huracán.

Club career
Curruhinca made his professional debut with Huracán in a 1–1 Argentine Primera División tie with Central Córdoba on 23 November 2019.

In January 2023, he joined Primera Nacional side Nueva Chicago on a one-year loan deal. He made his debut at a  1-1 away tie against All Boys on 3 February 2023.

References

External links

2000 births
Living people
People from Viedma
Argentine footballers
Association football wingers
Argentine Primera División players
Primera Nacional players
Club Atlético Huracán footballers
Nueva Chicago footballers